Morgan McPherson (born 1968) was the mayor of Key West, Florida. He was elected in 2005 and defeated for reelection in 2009.

Election
In 2005, Morgan McPherson narrowly defeated incumbent Mayor Jimmy Weekley by 24 votes. Then in 2009 McPherson lost reelection to Craig Cates by over 1,000 votes.

Education
 Key West High School
 Florida State University

See also
Key West, Florida

External links
 Profile from the office of the mayor of Key West
 McPherson's leadership style
 Info on McPherson's victory

Living people
Florida State University alumni
Mayors of Key West, Florida
1968 births